This article provides a summary of results for the general elections to the Canadian province of Ontario's unicameral legislative body, the Legislative Assembly of Ontario. The number of seats has varied over time, from 82 for the first election in 1867, to a high of 130 for 1987, 1990 and 1995 elections. There are currently 124 seats. , Ontario elections are held every 4 years on the first Thursday in June.

Prior to 1867, Canada's confederation, elections had been held in Ontario to elect members of the Legislative Assembly of Upper Canada, starting in 1792.

Results by general election

See also
 Timeline of Canadian elections
 List of political parties in Ontario
 List of Ontario by-elections

References

Notes

External links
 Elections Ontario

Ontario general elections
Elections, general